Viktar Lebedzeu (born January 12, 1994) is a Belarusian male acrobatic gymnast. He and his partner, Iryna Kuska, finished 8th in the 2014 Acrobatic Gymnastics World Championships.

References

1994 births
Living people
Belarusian acrobatic gymnasts
Male acrobatic gymnasts